Lawrence Whitaker is a game designer who has worked primarily on role-playing games.

Career
Lawrence Whitaker had worked on Chaosium fanzines. Whitaker worked with RuneQuest'''s Basic Role-Playing system on Chaosium's Eternal Champion games in the 1990s. In 2007, Whitaker was brought in to Mongoose Publishing, where he became the author of their fourth RuneQuest setting, Elric of Melniboné (2007). Whitaker was able to take a hand in the authorship of many critical books in Mongoose's RuneQuest line, mainly spread across their universal, Second Age and Elric lines.

Whitaker and Pete Nash decided to revamp Mongoose's RuneQuest game and thus they released RuneQuest II. Whitaker decided to leave Mongoose later in 2010 after a four-year run with the company. After Mongoose's license to RuneQuest expired, Mongoose kept the game in print under the title Legend. Meanwhile, Whitaker and Nash formed a company, The Design Mechanism, to pick up the RuneQuest license and publish a sixth edition of the game in 2012. That edition remained in print until 2016, when it was retitled Mythras''.

Whitaker has also worked for Alephtar Games.

References

External links
 

Living people
Place of birth missing (living people)
Role-playing game designers
Year of birth missing (living people)